Frederick James Hawkes (June 21, 1934 – May 9, 2019) was a Canadian politician. He was Member of Parliament for Calgary West from 1979 until 1993.

Early life and education
Hawkes was born in Calgary, Alberta.  He studied at Sir George Williams College (now Concordia University), obtaining a B.A. degree in 1957.

Hawkes returned to academia after several years to study psychology, earning an M.Sc. degree in this field from the University of Calgary in 1968, and a Ph.D. degree in experimental psychology from Colorado State University in 1970.

In 1971, Hawkes became an associate professor in the Faculty of Social Welfare at the University of Calgary, then in 1975 he received tenure.

Political career
In 1976–1977, Hawkes served as a program director for Joe Clark, then leader of the Progressive Conservative Party and Leader of the Opposition.

In 1979, he ran as the Progressive Conservative candidate for the riding of Calgary West, and was elected to the House of Commons. He was re-elected in 1980, 1984, and 1988.

From 1985 to 1986, Hawkes' chief aide was future prime minister Stephen Harper. Harper's term as aide was short, and he later described this time in Ottawa as deeply disillusioning.

Hawkes was re-elected in the 1988 election in which his chief opponent was his former protégé Harper, now running for the newly founded Reform Party of Canada.

From 1988 to 1993, Hawkes also served as the Chief Government Whip inside the House of Commons.

In the 1993 federal election, Hawkes came third behind Harper (who won) and Liberal candidate Karen Gainer, becoming one of many PC MPs who were defeated at the polls.

Personal life and death
In 1957, Hawkes married Joanne Christine Herriot (1937–2013). The Hawkes had two living children: Teresa Anne "Terri" (born 1958) and Robert James (born 1961). Robert Hawkes reached Master level in chess by his late teens. They had another daughter Colleen Rose, who died four days after birth.

Hawkes, who had dementia in his final years, died in Calgary on May 9, 2019, at the age of 84.

References

Other sources
Kenneth Whyte, "The right-wingers duke it out in the Calgary West corral", Globe and Mail, 2 October 1993, D2.

External links

 

1934 births
2019 deaths
Members of the House of Commons of Canada from Alberta
Politicians from Calgary
Progressive Conservative Party of Canada MPs
Sir George Williams University alumni
University of Calgary alumni
Deaths from dementia in Canada